Marie-Claire Kirkland-Casgrain,  (September 8, 1924 – March 24, 2016) was a Quebec lawyer, judge and politician. She was the first woman elected to the Legislative Assembly of Quebec, the first woman appointed a Cabinet minister in Quebec, the first woman appointed acting premier, and the first woman judge to serve in the Quebec Provincial Court.

Life
Born in Palmer, Massachusetts, the daughter of Charles-Aimé Kirkland (who was studying at Harvard), a Quebec MLA from 1939 to 1961, and Rose Demers, she received a Bachelor of Arts in 1947 and a Bachelor of Civil Law in 1950 from McGill University. She was admitted to the Quebec Bar in 1952 and was made a Queen's Counsel in 1969. From 1952 to 1961, she practiced law in Montreal.

She was elected in a by-election as a Liberal in her father's riding of Jacques-Cartier after his death in 1961. She was re-elected in 1962. She held two cabinet posts in the government of Jean Lesage: Minister without Portfolio (1962 to 1964) and Minister of Transport and Communications (1964 to 1966). In 1966, she was elected in the riding of Marguerite-Bourgeoys and re-elected in 1970. She also held two cabinet posts in the government of Robert Bourassa: Minister of Tourism, Game and Fishing (1970 to 1972) and Minister of Cultural Affairs (1972 to 1973).

She resigned in 1973 to become a judge. She retired in 1991.

In 1985, she was made a Knight of the National Order of Quebec. In 1992, she was made a Member of the Order of Canada. In 1993, she was the recipient of the Governor General's Award in Commemoration of the Persons Case.

She was married to lawyer Philippe Casgrain with whom she had three children before they eventually divorced. She remarried Wyndham Strover. On March 24, 2016, she died at the age of 91.

Legacy
In 2012, Quebec premier Pauline Marois unveiled a statue of Casgrain, Idola Saint-Jean and Kirkland outside the National Assembly of Quebec. The statue by Jules Lasalle was to celebrate the 50th anniversary of Kirkland being made the first female cabinet minister in Quebec.

She was the first woman in the history of Quebec to be honoured with a national funeral.

References

External links
 National Order of Quebec citation 
 
 Order of Canada citation
 
 

1924 births
2016 deaths
Judges in Quebec
Lawyers in Quebec
Knights of the National Order of Quebec
Members of the Order of Canada
McGill University alumni
McGill University Faculty of Law alumni
People from Palmer, Massachusetts
Quebec Liberal Party MNAs
Women MNAs in Quebec
Canadian women judges
Canadian women lawyers
Canadian King's Counsel
Women government ministers of Canada
Beaubien-Casgrain family
Governor General's Award in Commemoration of the Persons Case winners